Vidi can also refer to Vidi, Prince of Albania.
Vidi can also refer to Hungarian Football Team MOL Vidi FC.

Vidi or Videe or Virdee is a village near the town Anjar, the taluka of Kutch district in the Indian state of Gujarat. It is at a distance of about 4 km from Anjar, the Taluka headquarters.

History

Vidi, is one of the 19 villages founded by Kutch Gurjar Kshatriyas or Mistris. The Mistri community first moved into Saurashtra in the early 7th century and later a major group in the 12th century entered Kutch andestablished themselves at Dhaneti. Later in the 12th century they moved between Anjar and Bhuj and founded the villages of Anjar, Sinugra, Khambhra, Nagalpar, Khedoi, Madhapar, Hajapar, Kukma, Galpadar, Reha, Vidi, Ratnal, Jambudi, Devariya, Lovaria, Nagor, Chandiya, Meghpar and Kumbharia. The Mistris of these villages have built and developed the infrastructure around the villages in late 1890.

 However, majority of old houses of Mistris with unique architect were destroyed in the earthquake of 26 January 2001.

Temples

There is a Hanuman Mandir inside a cave on the outskirts of Vidi, which is very known in nearby areas of Kachchh.

Kuldevi Temples of many clans of the Mistri community are also there in this village.

References

Villages in Kutch district